The 2019 Chooks-to-Go Pilipinas 3x3 season is the inaugural season of the Chooks-to-Go Pilipinas 3x3 basketball league.

Teams
12 teams, many of which are from the Maharlika Pilipinas Basketball League (MPBL), participated in the inaugural conference.

For the Patriot's Cup, the second conference two foreign teams were invited to participate, VetHealth-Delhi 3BL from India and Moscow Inanomo from Russia. However Moscow will start playing in the second leg of the conference. The Thunder Pateros Hunters played in lieu of the Marikina Shoemasters in the first leg as a guest team.

Teams can name up to six players in their rosters for each conference but can opt not to fill up all six slots right away. However they cannot replace any player.

Pre-season events

Manok ng Bayan-SBP 3X3

The Manok ng Bayan-SBP 3X3, a basketball youth tournament for boys and girls was held in Cebu as the official kickoff event of the 2019 Chooks-to-Go Pilipinas 3x3 season. The event was an attempt to break the record for the biggest FIBA-sanctioned youth tournament by participants, as well as to accumulate FIBA Federation Ranking points for the Philippines in order for the country to gain enough points to qualify to send a team to the 3x3 event at the 2020 Summer Olympics.

2019 President's Cup
The President's Cup is the first conference of the Chooks-to-Go Pilipinas 3x3 season. The conference is exclusive to Filipinos and imports or foreigners are ineligible. However players of foreign descent who can prove their Filipino heritage are eligible to play. The conference consisted of five legs each considered as a separate tournament. A sixth leg, the Grand Finals, was planned but later scrapped.

The top placing team in the grand final qualifies for the FIBA 3x3 World Tour while the next top two teams gain a berth each at the inaugural Asia-Pacific Super Quest.

Leg venues and winners

2019 Patriot's Cup
The Patriot's Cup (also known as 2019 Chooks-to-Go Pilipinas 3x3 Patriot's Cup presented by Coca-Cola for sponsorship reasons) is the second conference of the Chooks-to-Go Pilipinas 3x3 league. Unlike the President's Cup, the tournament as a reinforced conference allows each of the participating teams to field a single foreign import. The conference will feature at least five legs with a Super Quest tournament possibly to be held as the sixth leg. The conference is set to commence on June 16, 2019 with the first leg scheduled be held in Cebu.

All of the twelve teams which played in the first conference will play in the Patriot's Cup with four or eight teams being considered to be allowed to make their debut in this conference. This includes two foreign teams each from Indonesia and Japan.

Leg venues and winners

2019 Magiting Cup
The Magiting Cup (also known as 2019 Chooks-to-Go Pilipinas 3x3 Magiting Cup presented by Coca-Cola for sponsorship reasons) is the third conference of the Chooks-to-Go Pilipinas 3x3 league.

Leg venues and winners

MelMac Cup
In addition to the three regular conference, Chooks-to-Go Pilipinas also organized the MelMac Cup. The MelMac Cup had two tournaments or "seasons", each with multiple legs. Wilkins Balanga Pure is the winner of Season 2 which ended on October 31, 2019. Pasig was the winner of the first season which concluded on October 22, 2019. The first season also featured a women's tournament which had Ever Bilena as winners.

Notes

References

Chooks-to-Go Pilipinas 3x3
2018–19 in Philippine basketball leagues